TV Verdade is a multinational Brazilian-based religious broadcast station of the international Christian organization, Members Church of God International (Portuguese: Membros da Igreja de Deus Internacional) for the Portuguese-speaking countries.

TV Verdade airs 24 hours a day, 7 days a week via Star One C2 satellite in South American countries and SES-6 satellite which also covers South American countries as a redundancy, including other nations in North America, Europe and North Africa.

Its studios are located in a broadcast facility, a garage transformed into a makeshift studio in Florianópolis, Santa Catarina, Brazil, shared with MCGI's other television stations, TV La Verdad and The Truth Channel.

It is known for its broadcast of O Caminho Antigo (English: The Old Path, Tagalog: Ang Dating Daan), the longest-running religious program in the Philippines, hosted by international televangelist Bro. Eli Soriano and Kuya Daniel Razon of the Members Church of God International.

History

2009–2012

Early years 
On December 26, 2009, During the second day of the International Thanksgiving of MCGI, Bro. Eli Soriano (via live video streaming) announced the launched of a new television channel outside the Philippines, the Brethren of the church gathered worldwide. A huge crowd gathered at the ADD Convention Center in Apalit, Pampanga cheered as the then-Presiding Minister showed the new TV network’s logo on LED screens positioned across the Center.

TV Verdade's test broadcast started in December 2009. Its broadcast feed originates from a small garage, around 48 square meters, transformed into a makeshift broadcasting studio located in Florianópolis, Santa Catarina, Brazil. It originally aired the Portuguese and Spanish versions of Ang Dating Daan until 2012 when TV La Verdad was release.

2012–present 
The station currently carries the 24-hour Portuguese broadcast of O Caminho Antigo (English: The Old Path, Tagalog: Ang Dating Daan), the longest-running religious program in the Philippines.

Free to air broadcasting 
In 2015, TV Verdade was granted the authority by the Ministry of Communications (Portuguese: Ministério das Comunicações, abbreviated MiniCom) to build and operate its own television network in Brazil, initially in Minas Gerais, the second most populous state the country. Roll-out of its analog relay stations in various cities in the state of Paraná is ongoing.

High-definition television 
In December 2016, TV Verdade HD was launched in high definition (HD) format (1080p) for households in South and Central America and some parts of North America via SES-6 for free. It also completed the upgrade of its satellite systems, production facilities, including the acquisition of HD cameras in South America to comply with the requirements of the Ministry of Communications in Brazil.

2020s

COVID-19 Pandemic 
In April 2020, O Caminho Antiguo began its live broadcast with all of its host and viewers are online, as the world prepares for the COVID-19 Pandemic.

In May 2020, the Members Church of God International announced the release of the Oração Global pela Humanidade (English: Global Prayer for Humanity) in different languages including Portuguese virtually, it aims to gather people from across the globe, with different races and religions in praying together and asking for God’s help and mercy during these perilous times in the pandemic.

In June 2020, O Caminho Antiguo introduced for the first time to the public the O Caminho Antiguo: Doutrinação em Massa through TV Verdade and different social media platforms in preparation for the new normal.

The Members Church of God International has conducted a series of relief operations in Latin America where cases of COVID-19 continue to surge. Volunteers have brought food and supplies and church members delivered relief assistance using their own vehicles, while still observing all the safety protocols while distributing the goods.

Programs

Current 

 O Caminho Antiguo (2009)
O Caminho Antiguo: Doutrinação em Massa (2020)
 Oração Comunitária (2011)
 Oração Global pela Humanidade (2020)
 Pergunte ao Irmão Eli Soriano, A Bíblia Responderá (2009)

Former 

El Camino Antiguo (2009-2012; moved to TV La Verdad)

Satellite Broadcast 
TV Verdade can be received via satellite in Brazil and other countries in Asia, Australia, North America, South America, Europe and Africa.

* On-Air

Stations

Mobile application 
On February 11, 2014, MCGI launched the MCGI Broadcast App for iOS and Android for mobile and tablet devices. In 2016, it was also made available to Windows Mobile device users. By downloading the mobile application, users with stable internet connection will be able to watch the broadcast feed of TV Verdade for free.

References

External links 

Members Church of God International
Religious broadcasting
Television networks in Brazil
Television channels and stations established in 2009